The World Association of International Studies (WAIS) was founded by Ronald Hilton in 1965 as the California Institute of International Studies at Stanford University's Bolivar House. WAIS membership is by invitation only. The stated goal of WAIS is "finding Peace, Light and Truth (Pax, Lux et Veritas) through informed, balanced, and spirited cross-disciplinary discussions".

WAIS has conducted many conferences since its inception.

Publications
From 1965 to 1970, the Hispanic American Report was the publication of the California Institute of International Studies. In 1970, it was succeeded by the World Affairs Report. WAIS discontinued the publication of the printed version of the World Affairs Report in 1990. The online version continued on the WAIS home page. World Affairs Report is updated daily. Since 2006, the editor in chief is John Eipper (Adrian College).

References

External links
 

Organizations based in California
International relations
Research institutes established in 1965
1965 establishments in California